Home Affairs refers to an interior ministry in government.

Home Affairs may also refer to:

 Ministry of home affairs, a common type of government department, including a list
 Home Affairs (TV series), from 2005
 Home Affairs (horse), Australian thoroughbred racehorse

See also

 Internal affairs (disambiguation)
 Affair (disambiguation)
 Home (disambiguation)